HCM-6A is an LAE galaxy that was found in 2002 by Esther Hu and Lennox Cowie 
from the University of Hawaii and  Richard McMahon  from the University of Cambridge, using the Keck II Telescope in Hawaii. HCM-6A is located behind the Abell 370 galactic cluster, near M77 in the constellation Cetus, which enabled the astronomers to use Abell 370 as a gravitational lens to get a clearer image of the object.

HCM-6A was the farthest object known at the time of its discovery. It exceeded SSA22−HCM1 (z = 5.74) as the most distant normal galaxy known, and quasar SDSSp J103027.10+052455.0 (z = 6.28) as the most distant object known. In 2003, SDF J132418.3+271455 (z = 6.578) was discovered, and took over the title of most remote object known, most remote galaxy known, and most remote normal galaxy known.

References

Dwarf galaxies
Cetus (constellation)